The Patient: Patient-Centered Outcomes Research is a quarterly peer-reviewed medical journal dedicated to presenting solely the patient's perspective. The journal is published by Adis in collaboration with the Department of Health Policy and Management at the Johns Hopkins Bloomberg School of Public Health. The first issue of the journal was published in 2008.

According to the Journal Citation Reports, the journal has a 2021 impact factor of 3.535.

Abstracting and indexing 
The journal is abstracted and indexed in EMBASE/Excerpta Medica, PsycINFO, RePEc, MEDLINE, CINAHL, Current Contents/Social & Behavioral Sciences, and the Social Sciences Citation Index.

References

External links 
 

Quarterly journals
Publications established in 2008
General medical journals
Springer Science+Business Media academic journals
English-language journals